Korea's Next Top Model, season 3 (or Do-jeon Supermodel Korea, season 3) is the third season of the Korean reality television show in which a number of women compete for the title of Korea's Next Top Model and a chance to start their career in the modelling industry.

This season featured eighteen contestants in its final cast. The prizes for this season included: A cash prize of 100,000,000 Korean won, a cover shoot and editorial in W Magazine Korea, a modelling contract with YGKPlus and a modelling contract with Major Model Management in New York.

The winner of the competition was 21-year-old Choi So-ra who has one of the most successful careers for any Top model Winner from the franchise.

Contestants
(ages stated are at start of contest and use the Korean system of determining age)

Episodes

Airport Fashion Couture and Captivating Goddesses of Nature
Original Airdate: July 21, 2012

The models undergo an interview with the judges, including host Jang Yoon-ju, and face a trio runway challenge at the airport when they arrive for casting. Most of the girls impress, while some fail to excel. Yeon-hee, So-ra, Se-hee, and Han-bit excel. Da-min also manages to make a lasting impression. After the runway, the models take part in a photoshoot challenge at the airport, which will be followed by an elimination later on that day. At the shoot, Cho-won, So-ra, So-hyun, Na-hyun, Han-bit, Yeon-hee and Jin-kyung manage to impress. A handful of other semi finalists fall flat.

Host Yoon Ju rounds up the semi-finalists, and tells them that they will all have to pass through a metal detector. If the metal detector beeps, the model has not made it to the top 16. If the model is able to pass through the detector without having it beep, they will be part of the final 16 contestants. Later, two contestants who were initially rejected (Da-min & Hae-rin) are added to the cast after a change of heart, bringing the final number to 18 contestants.

The final 18 models undergo a second photoshoot at Jeju Island, where they pose as Goddesses of nature.

So-ra's photograph is praised during judging, and she receives a first call-out.

So-hyun, Da-min, Han-sol and Hae-rin, ultimately land in the bottom four due to their poor performance at the shoot. Yoon Ju hands the final photograph to So-hyun, thus eliminating the other three contestants.
 First call-out: Choi So-ra
 Bottom four: Kwon Da-min, Min Hae-rin, Jung Han-sol & Ko So-hyun
 Eliminated: Kwon Da-min, Min Hae-rin, Jung Han-sol
 Featured photographer: Nam Hyeon-beom (Casting), Kim Young-joon

Conceptional Group Shots
Original Airdate: July 28, 2012

The contestant were grouped by one of the host and required to film a short fashion clip embodying a specific theme.

The groups were deliberated and Team 3 of the leader Han-bit won the challenge and the prize was an exclusive lunch in a luxurious yacht.
 Reward Challenge Winner: Team 3 (Ji So-yeon, Lee Seul-ki, Heo Kyung-hee, Ko So-hyun & Choi Han-bit)

The photoshoot is a group shot with exceptional concepts.

During deliberation at the judging panel, Cho-won was hailed the best and as well as her group embodying stark minimalism. So-hyun was deemed also exceptional though her group Agriculture was deemed the worst, She was called eleventh place but if it was an individual shot, she might be on the top 3 photos. Seul-ki and So-yeon landed at the bottom 2 for their uninspiring presence and mediocre photos. Despite both of them appearing in bottom 2 first time, So-yeon was spared and Seul-ki was eliminated although she produced a stellar photo last week.
 First call-out: Kang Cho-won
 Bottom two: Lee Seul-ki & Ji So-yeon
 Eliminated: Lee Seul-ki
 Featured photographer: Kim Young-jun
 Special guests: Kang Seung-hyun

High Fashion Editorial Olympiads
Original Airdate: August 4, 2012

At the makeovers, almost everyone was satisfied with their new looks.

The contestant are required their third photoshoot and that is shooting a High fashion olympic couture inspired by London-Olympic. The girls were divided into:

During panel, Han-bit produces her best stellar shot to date but she did not earn the first call out. Jin-kyung were compared to Jung Sun of season 2 because of their age and flawless high fashion ability thus, she gained the first call out of the week. Yeon-hee, Min-jung, Na-hyun, Se-hee and Hanbit produced stellar while other fall flat and ultimately, Kyung-hee and So-yeon landed in the Bottom two. Because of her second appearance in the Bottom 2, So-yeon eliminated thus Kyung-hee spared.
 First call-out: Kim Jin-kyung
 Bottom two: Heo Kyung-hee & Ji So-yeon
 Eliminated: Ji So-yeon
 Featured photographer: Yoo Young-kyu (Makeover) & Jo Seon-hee
 Special guests: Taeyang & Kim Hyun-suk

Petitzel Orange Commercial
Original Airdate: August 11, 2012

The contestant were required to attend a vocal class of Phantom of the opera and their challenge is to sing their pieces in front of others. Min-jung hailed the most dramatic and gained the winner title of the challenge and the prize of a jewelry. She chooses Ji-su to accompany her to the boutique.
 Reward Challenge Winner: Lee Min-jung

The Photo shoot was not actually involve in photos but shooting a commercial.

Most of the girls impressed the judges at the panel. Na-hyun didn't kept her composure and reveal that So-ra's commercial was not appropriate when she crumpled the cup during the commercial. The revelation result into a small altercation between the two front-runners. So-hyun was hailed the best out of the bunch and gained her first and well deserved first call out followed next by Yeon-hee, So-ra, Na-hyun, Min-jung and Cho-won. Other contestant fall flat. Ji-su and Mi-rim landed at the bottom two producing worst commercials. Despite of strong portfolio, Mi-rim was eliminated and Ji-su was saved.
 First call-out: Ko So-hyun
 Bottom two: Jang Mi-rim & Hong Ji-su
 Eliminated: Jang Mi-rim
 Featured commercial director: Cha Woon-taek
 Special guests: Kolleen Park & Jang Moon-jung

"High" Fashion Spy
Original Airdate: August 18, 2012

The contestants were surprised in the morning by a person dressed up as Spider-Man descending from the roof of their house. Later, they were required to practise stunts in midair on a wall while secured on wires. So-ra knocked her leg and back on the wall while practising and complained of back pain constantly, which annoyed some of the girls. Then, all the girls were paired for the challenge, which was to perform the stunts taught in synchronization with their partners. Cho-won and Jin-kyung were declared the winners and won the right to assign house chores to the other contestants.
 Reward Challenge Winner: Kang Cho-won & Kim Jin-kyung

The next morning, the girls were welcomed by their creative director and played a video message from Americas Next Top Model's creative director, Jay Manuel. Mr. Jay was then revealed to be right behind them and surprised the girls for the next photo shoot.

The photo shoot required the girls to pose on a high-rise building embodying a secret agent or spy. Because of So-hyun's first call-out in the previous episode, she got to decide the order of which the girls get their photos taken. So-ra was the first girl up. Within seconds from being dropped down from the roof of the building slowly, So-ra panicked and could not start her shoot. After a few other girls took their photos, she requested the props department to provide her the fake gun Han-bit used in her photo shoot to aid her posing, which rubbed some of the girls the wrong way. Most of the girls impressed Jay, especially So-hyun and Han-bit, who produced stellar photos in a variety of excellent poses. During panel, So-hyun was deemed to be the best and earned her second consecutive first call-out, followed by Yeon-hee and Han-bit. Cho-won's photo was deemed amazing by all the judges, with the exception of Jay, who said she looked as though she needed to go to the bathroom. This caused Cho-won to cry after her critique, and Jay saying that she needs to be more mature and tough in such a harsh industry like modelling. The other girls did not seem to impress at all. So-ra was reprimanded for her terrible attitude on set, which reflected in her photo. During her critique, So-ra's bad habit of tearing the skin under her fingernails caused her hands to bleed in front of the judges. Ultimately, Kyung-hee and Min-jung landed bottom two. Kyung-hee for not taking the competition seriously and Min-jung for her cliche photos. Min-jung was given a chance and Kyung-hee was eliminated.
 First call-out: Ko So-hyun
 Bottom two: Lee Min-jung & Heo Kyung-hee
 Eliminated: Heo Kyung-hee
 Featured photographer: Oh Joong-seok
 Special guests: Go Eun-kyeong & Jay Manuel

Vampire Brides
Original Airdate: August 25, 2012

After the elimination, the girls told So-ra about their issues with her, specifically that she was seemingly complaining too much about things that were affecting all the girls — for example, the pain and discomfort of the previous photoshoot — and the fact that she appeared to steal ideas from other girls (such as Na-hyun's cup-crushing idea during the commercial shoot, and Han-bit's gun prop during the spy photo shoot). So-ra was dejected after the conversation, which was noticed by the other girls.

The remaining 11 contestants were treated to a lunch with male guests. Unbeknownst to them, however, this was a challenge about being professional wherever the models are.  The two models that impressed the modelling trainer were Cho-won and Ji-su, who were treated to jewelry. In addition, there was only one watch to be won; Ji-su allowed Cho-won to keep the watch.
 Reward Challenge Winner: Kang Cho-won & Hong Ji-su

Soon after, they were individually interviewed by Christian Paris of Major Model Management, and the girls were warned beforehand that this would be an elimination challenge. Most girls impressed Christian, especially Ji-su's facial features, Se-hee's sense of style, and So-ra's look in general. So-hyun's height was deemed a little too short for modelling, but Christian stated to her that if she's able to outshine the other taller contestants, she can be booked. Cho-won's cute personality did not sit well with Christian. Christian pointed out to some models what they needed to work on in order to get booked. Ji-su was the first person called.  Han-bit and Eun-hwa were in the bottom two. The casting director previously stated that Eun-hwa was gaining too much weight for modelling.  The director also disapproved of Han-bit, as she unnecessarily danced during her audition. Ultimately, Han-bit was the last person called out, and Eun-hwa was eliminated.
 Reward Challenge Winner: Hong Ji-su
 Bottom two: Yoon Eun-hwa & Choi Han-bit
 Eliminated outside of judging panel: Yoon Eun-hwa

The photoshoot required the girls to pose with male models for a "Vampire Bride" concept.  As So-hyun was the winner of the previous shoot, she was able to again choose the order in which the girls go for their photoshoot; So-ra was surprisingly chosen to go second, after Min-jung. The girls complained that So-ra seemed to attract special attention from the photographer, as she was allowed to practice with the photographer prior to the actual shoot.  Many of the girls had some difficulties, but So-hyun and Yeon-hee received strong praise from the creative director and the photographer.

Both the photographer and Christian Paris were part of the judging panel.  Upon viewing So-ra's photo, Paris disagreed with the rest of the judges, as he felt that it was lacking in emotion and underwhelming; however, the rest of the panel expressed their contentment over her photo.  So-hyun's picture left judge Lee Hye-ju "breathless" and stated that she did not seem to be an amateur model.  She continued to say that she underestimated her (and the photographer admitted this as well), but that So-hyun's ability to understand and work with the concept was surprising.  Yeon-hee's picture was also well received by the panel: the photographer stated that she totally let go of any inhibitions and surprised the entire crew with her modelling, and Lee Hye-ju stated that she would choose Yeon-hee as "Best Actress".  Han Sang-hyeok confirmed that Yeon-hee was runner-up quite often, and that he hoped that she would not be runner-up this week.

Ultimately, So-hyun was the girl first called out, and Yeon-hee was second, each for the third week in a row.  The bottom two were Han-bit and Se-hee.  Jang Yoon-ju stated that for Se-hee, the issue was that even with her makeover, she was unable to showcase her modelling abilities in photoshoots and demonstrate to the judges that she had what it takes to become a top model.  For Han-bit, the issue was that her acting ability was demonstrated in the picture, as expected, but the judges were getting tired of her overacting and unnatural poses, and that for her to become a high fashion, she must learn to exercise restraint.  Se-hee was the last girl called out, and Han-bit was eliminated.
 First call-out: Ko So-hyun
 Bottom two: Choi Han-bit & Choi Se-hee
 Eliminated: Choi Han-bit
 Featured photographer: Kim Wook
 Special guests: Christian Paris, Fabian & An Jae-hyeon

Underwater Mermaids
Original Airdate: September 1, 2012

The girls were undergone a runway tutorial wearing high fashion couture dresses. Most of them did well but most of them fell because of the difficulty of the dress like Ji-su, and So-ra. Later that day, The remaining contestants were introduced to their challenge. A live fashion runway walk in a spinning stage. So-hyun fell flat as much as the girls. Ji-su excelled and won reward.
 Reward Challenge Winner: Hong Ji-su

The challenge required the contestants to shoot an underwater motion editorial and they were grouped into:

So-hyun once again captivated the panel during deliberation though she was reprimanded for having one angle on her stellar portfolio. She was deemed the most excelled and called "magical" in her motion. Yeon-hee, Jin-kyung, Na-hyun and Cho-won also excelled while Min-jung and Ji-su disappointed the panel for producing bad motion due to their phobias. Yeon-hee got first call out because the judges considered her always second to So-hyun. She was followed by Cho-Won, Na-hyun and So-hyun. The two bestfriends Min-jung and Ji-su landed at the bottom and Jang Yoon-ju handed the last snapshot to Min-jung and eliminating Ji-su, despite she won the challenge.
 First call-out: Yeo Yeon-hee
 Bottom two: Lee Min-jung & Hong Ji-su
 Eliminated: Hong Ji-su
 Featured photographer: Lumpens
 Special guests: Yonny P, Steven J & Cha Woon-taek

Overseas to Cambodia; Oriental High Fashion
Original Airdate: September 8, 2012

Immediately after the elimination, the girls were told by Jang Yoon-ju that they had to go pack their bags for their overseas destination, without telling the girls where they would be going.  The next day, the girls landed in Cambodia.  Although pleasantly surprised by the choice, the girls were unhappy with the high humidity and the relatively basic hotel they were staying at.  Later on, the girls visited a village school where they interacted with the children and fed them lunch.  This was a challenge, so the contestants were paired off in twos.  At the end of the day, the models held a "runway" show with the children.  The girls who "won" the challenge were Cho-won and So-ra, who had 300 sets of school supplies donated to the school in their name.
 Reward Challenge Winner: Kang Cho-won & Choi So-ra

The photoshoot was at an old ruined temple, with an "Oriental High Fashion" concept set over a thousand years ago.  The challenge winners were given the choice of "stealing" 10 frames from other contestants.  Cho-won stole ten frames from Yeon-hee (with the reason that she saw her as a top competitor), while So-ra took them from Jin-kyung (stating that she believed her good shots were from genetics and luck).  Min-jung and Jin-kyung pleasantly surprised the creative director, whereas Cho-won and Se-hee struggled to showcase the concept. Na-hyun was noted for complaining and not pushing herself to do her best.

Both the photographer and the creative director were guest judges on the panel.  During judging, the girls were judged using both a body shot and a close-up. Min-jung and Jin-kyung were praised for their understanding of the concepts and their poses; Min-jung's photo was labelled as her best to date. On the other hand, Se-hee was considered extremely awkward in her photos; Jang Yoon-ju stated that her hands were odd in both shots, and that both shots were ultimately poor. Cho-won's photos were liked by the judges, but those on set during the shoot noted that it was due to luck, and that the model really needed to quickly learn how to pose for the camera.  Na-hyun's photos were stated to be poor, and the judges stated that she showed her discomfort too obviously, although judge Lee Hye-ju stated that she at least emoted well with her face; So-ra, on the other hand, was criticized for not emoting enough. So-hyun was noted to have a poor wide shot (but praised for her close-up), and the creative director advised Yeon-hee to start changing up her poses in more subtle ways, and to make it more sophisticated. During judging, both So-ra and Na-hyun were noted to be losing their spark over the competition's duration.

To her own surprise, Min-jung was the first girl to be called out. The bottom two were Na-hyun and Se-hee. Na-hyun was disciplined for her inability to keep striving forward and mask any frustrations or difficulties. Se-hee was taken to task for being unable to live up to her potential and the fact that she had yet to surprise the judges with any of her photos. Ultimately, Se-hee was eliminated.
 First call-out: Lee Min-jung
 Bottom two: Lee Na-hyun and Choi Se-hee
 Eliminated: Choi Se-hee
 Featured photographer: Bori

Overseas to Vietnam; Le Petit Prince
Original Airdate: September 15, 2012

They're playing a truth game. Sohyun is pissed off with Chowon and vice versa. Yeonhee is telling Minjeong to control her expressions because she always looks pissed off. And Jingyeong is awkward at that table because she likes Chowon while the others are talking about Chowon.
 Reward Challenge Winner: Yeo Yeon-hee
 First call-out: Lee Na-hyun
 Bottom two: Kang Cho-won and Ko So-hyun
 Eliminated: Kang Cho-won
 Featured photographer: Oh Joong-seok
 Special guests: Yang Ji-hae

Real-Life Dolls
Original Airdate: September 22, 2012

The girls introduced into a one on one posing challenge showcasing their posing abilities and variety of Posing styles. Yeon-hee and So-ra excelled while defeating other girls.
 Reward Challenge Winner: Yeo Yeon-hee

Later they were introduced into their next photoshoot: Posing as a High Fashion Dolls.  The contestants were given specific type of dolls that they need to embody.

At the photoshoot, Most of the girls struggled like So-hyun crying during photoshoot Thus, producing stellar photo again. Jin-kyung was hailed as the first call-out of the bunch. Next is Na-hyun, So-hyun and So-ra. Yeon-hee and Min-jung dropped at the bottom two. The judges considered that Yeon-hee is a top competitor than Min-jung thus eliminating Min-jung.
 First call-out: Kim Jin-kyung
 Bottom two: Yeo Yeon-hee and Lee Min-jung
 Eliminated: Lee Min-jung
 Featured photographer: Shin Sun-hye

Metrocity Special Runway
Original Airdate: September 29, 2012
 Special guests: Lee JiHoon

Magic Circus
Original Airdate: October 6, 2012
 Reward Challenge Winner: Yeo Yeon-hee

The Judges were impressed by Yeon-hee's performance and dedication that is why she earned the best photo. So-hyun and Na-hyun underperformed and castigated by their photos and sent home.

 First call-out: Yeo Yeon-hee
 Bottom three: Ko So-hyun, Lee Na-hyun & Choi So-ra
 Eliminated: Ko So-hyun & Lee Na-hyun
 Featured photographer: Hong Jang-hyun
 Special guests: Go Jae-hee, Shin Eun-young & Cha Woon-taek

Top Model Reunion
Original Airdate: October 13, 2012

Grand Final
Original Airdate: October 20, 2012

The final three attended a Fashion Runway. Yeon-hee was eliminated first on their pre-elimination round leaving Jin-kyung and So-ra. The judges evaluated the two's portfolio and performance throughout the course of the show and saw So-ra has the chance to make it big, plus with her performance that lead to her being crowned as the winner.
 Eliminated: Yeo Yeon-hee
 Final two: Kim Jin-kyung & Choi So-ra
 Korea's Next Top Model: Choi So-ra
 Featured photographer: Hong Jang-hyun
 Special guests: Jang Min-young, Choi Yoo-kyung & Song Kyung-a

Summaries

Call-out order

 The contestant was originally eliminated but was saved later
 The contestant was eliminated
 The contestant was eliminated outside of judging panel
 The contestant won the competition
 During the casting of episode 1, the pool of 30 girls was reduced to 16 contestants who would move on to the actual competition. The first call-out of the episode does not reflect on their performance at casting. Additionally, 2 more girls (Da-min & Hae-rin) were later added to the cast, bringing the final number to 18 contestants.
 In the second part of episode 1, Da-min, Hae-rin, Han-sol and So-hyun landed in the bottom four. Only So-hyun was saved, eliminating the former three models.
 In episode 6, there were two separate eliminations. The first took place outside of judging panel, and the ranking was determined by the casting director for the casting challenge.
 Episode 11 featured a double elimination with the bottom three contestants being in danger of elimination.
 Episode 12, was a reunion special featuring the contestants who participated during the season. Da-min, Hae-rin, Han-sol and Seul-ki decided not to take part in the reunion special

Episode 1 = Gladiator's Tournament

Episode 2 = Colonial Age Aristocrat Girl over Carriage, Tropical Editorial In Capri Island

Episode 3 = Pin Up And Artsy In Background  

Episode 4 = High Fashion Editorial With Metallic Body Painting At Italian Pizza Oven  

Episode 5 = Futuristic In The Dark

Episode 6 = Chinese Opera In Pairs, Beauty Shot Of Chinese Empress, Hair Movement In Beijing   

Episode 7 = Tropical Fairy Dress Show "From Undersea Wonders", Trapeze Acrobatic Show   

Episode 8 = Amphibi New Species   

Episode 9 = Exotica Swimwear Photoshoot In Pig Farm, Beachside Tropical Fashion Catalog Video   

Episode 10 = Redbull Challenge On Commercial, Sea Sport Photo Editorial   

Episode 11 = Indian Goddess High End Fashion   

Episode 12 = Glamorous Dramatical With Gowns And Wind Breaks In Waterfall In Iceland   

Episode 13 = Adventureous Photo Advertisement With Mercedes Benz Car In Sunrise

Episode 14 = Model Girl High Fashion In New York, Music And Documenter Video, Two Vogue Magazine Cover, Special Final Photo In Iran

Average  call-out order
Casting call & Episode 13 is not included.

Bottom two/three/four

 The contestant was eliminated after her first time in the bottom two/three
 The contestant was eliminated after her second time in the bottom two/three
 The contestant was eliminated after her third time in the bottom two/three 
 The contestant was eliminated in the final judging and placed third
 The contestant was eliminated in the final judging and placed as the runner-up

Photo Shoot Guide
 Episode 1 Photo Shoot: Airport Editorial (Casting) & Goddesses of Nature on Jeju Island
 Episode 2 Photo Shoot: Quintuplets Couture
 Episode 3 Photo Shoot: Olympic Sports
 Episode 4 Commercial: Petitzel Squeeze Orange
 Episode 5 Photo Shoot: Spies hanging from a skyscraper
 Episode 6 Photo Shoot: Vampire Brides with a Male Model
 Episode 7 Fashion Film: "Underwater Escape"
 Episode 8 Photo Shoot: Oriental Goddesses in a Temple
 Episode 9 Photo Shoot: Metrocity Campaign in the Desert
 Episode 10 Photo Shoot: Real-Life Sad Dolls
 Episode 11 Photo Shoot: Dramatic Circus Acrobats
 Episode 13 Photo Shoot: W Magazine Covers

Makeovers
 Cho-won - Lovely Bob Cut
 So-hyun - Modern Classic
 Jin-kyung - Street Vintage
 Yeon-hee - Glamorous Layered
 Eun-hwa - European Chic
 Na-hyun - Genderless
 Min-jung - Retro Volume
 Mi-rim - Avant-Garde Unbalance
 So-yeon - Natural Bang Hair
 Se-hee - Luxury Short Cut
 So-ra - Modern Chic
 Han-bit - Romantic Wave
 Kyung-hee - Tomboy
 Ji-su - Oriental Charisma

References 

Korea's Next Top Model
2012 South Korean television seasons